Sunnyside–Tahoe City is a census-designated place (CDP) in Placer County, California, located on the northwest shore of Lake Tahoe. It comprises two communities, Sunnyside, and Tahoe City.

Demographics

2010
The 2010 United States Census reported that Sunnyside–Tahoe City had a population of 1,557. The racial makeup of Sunnyside–Tahoe City was 1,480 (95.1%) White, 3 (0.2%) African American, 4 (0.3%) Native American, 15 (1.0%) Asian, 1 (0.1%) Pacific Islander, 32 (2.1%) from other races, and 22 (1.4%) from two or more races. Hispanic or Latino of any race were 84 persons (5.4%).

The Census reported that 1,550 people (99.6% of the population) lived in households, 7 (0.4%) lived in non-institutionalized group quarters, and 0 (0%) were institutionalized.

There were 744 households, out of which 120 (16.1%) had children under the age of 18 living in them, 268 (36.0%) were opposite-sex married couples living together, 29 (3.9%) had a female householder with no husband present, 24 (3.2%) had a male householder with no wife present.  There were 84 (11.3%) unmarried opposite-sex partnerships, and 5 (0.7%) same-sex married couples or partnerships. 255 households (34.3%) were made up of individuals, and 40 (5.4%) had someone living alone who was 65 years of age or older. The average household size was 2.08.  There were 321 families (43.1% of all households); the average family size was 2.64.

The population was spread out, with 191 people (12.3%) under the age of 18, 140 people (9.0%) aged 18 to 24, 549 people (35.3%) aged 25 to 44, 513 people (32.9%) aged 45 to 64, and 164 people (10.5%) who were 65 years of age or older.  The median age was 40.7 years. For every 100 females there were 120.5 males.  For every 100 females age 18 and over, there were 125.8 males.

The homeowner vacancy rate was 4.3%; the rental vacancy rate was 21.2%.  849 people (54.5% of the population) lived in owner-occupied housing units and 701 people (45.0%) lived in rental housing units.

2000
As of the census of 2000, there were 1,761 people, 789 households, and 362 families residing in the CDP. The racial makeup of the CDP was 95.34% White, 0.28% African American, 0.40% Native American, 1.31% Asian, 0.11% Pacific Islander, 0.45% from other races, and 2.10% from two or more races. Hispanic or Latino of any race were 3.63% of the population.

There were 789 households, out of which 20.8% had children under the age of 18 living with them, 37.9% were married couples living together, 4.6% had a female householder with no husband present, and 54.1% were non-families. 30.0% of all households were made up of individuals, and 3.7% had someone living alone who was 65 years of age or older.  The average household size was 2.23 and the average family size was 2.75.

In the CDP, the population was spread out, with 15.9% under the age of 18, 7.4% from 18 to 24, 45.0% from 25 to 44, 25.7% from 45 to 64, and 6.0% who were 65 years of age or older.  The median age was 36 years. For every 100 females there were 128.4 males.  For every 100 females age 18 and over, there were 132.5 males.

The median income for a household in the CDP was $56,875, and the median income for a family was $79,412. Males had a median income of $41,136 versus $25,833 for females. The per capita income for the CDP was $33,534.  About 1.1% of families and 5.5% of the population were below the poverty line, including none of those under the age of eighteen or sixty-five or over.

Climate
Sunnyside-Lake Tahoe has a warm-summer Mediterranean climate (Csb) according to the Köppen climate classification system.

<div style="width:75%">

See also
Tahoe City, California (unincorporated community)

References

Census-designated places in Placer County, California
Lake Tahoe
Populated places in the Sierra Nevada (United States)
Census-designated places in California